Ragusano, referencing the geographic region around Ragusa, Italy, may refer to:

Ragusano cheese
Ragusano donkey
 Asprinio Bianco, and Italian wine grape also known as Ragusano.